Los Veteranos may refer to the following places in the United States:

Los Veteranos I, Texas, census-designated place (CDP) in Webb County, Texas
Los Veteranos II, Texas, census-designated place (CDP) in Webb County, Texas